The Chic-Choc Mountains, also spelled Shick Shocks, is a mountain range in the central region of the Gaspe Peninsula in Quebec, Canada. It is a part of the Notre Dame Mountains, which is a continuation of the Appalachian Mountains.

History

The name Chic-Chocs comes from the Mi'kmaq word sigsôg, meaning "crags" or "rocky mountains." It has undergone many different spellings over time, including Chikchâks (1836), Shick-shock (1857), and Chick-Saws (1863).

Geography
The Chic-Chocs run parallel to the St. Lawrence River and are located some 20 to 40 kilometers inland.
The Chic-Chocs are heavily eroded, with rounded, flattened tops and steep sides. Caribou can be found in the plateaus of this region.

Tourism
Although visited by just a few tourists, Chic-Choc Mountains became much more popular in the late 1990s as backcountry skiing gained popularity in Eastern Canada.

Some of the most popular backcountry skiing areas in the region include Mont Hogs Back, Mont Albert, Champ Mars, Mount Logan, and Mines Madeleine.

The mountains near Mont Saint Pierre are a destination for ice climbers.

A network of trails, including the International Appalachian Trail, passes through these mountains. Quebec's Parc national de la Gaspésie protects most of the mountain range.

Gallery

References

External links
 Peakbagger.com page
 Mark A. Brennan Landscape Paintings of the Chic-Choc Mountains

Gaspé Peninsula
Mountains of Quebec
Mountain ranges of Quebec
Subranges of the Appalachian Mountains
Landforms of Gaspésie–Îles-de-la-Madeleine
Notre Dame Mountains